In February 2023, President of Sri Lanka Ranil Wickremesinghe awarded the highest national honour to the former Speaker of the Parliament of Sri Lanka Karu Jayasuriya.

Sri Lankabhimanya
 Karu Jayasuriya

References

Sri Lanka National Honours
National Honours
Civil awards and decorations of Sri Lanka